Afella is a mountain located in the Western High Atlas range. Its highest peak is at 4043 metres.

References

Mountains of Morocco